Cyperus undulatus is a species of sedge that is native to Tanzania and Kenya in eastern tropical Africa.

The species was first formally described by the botanist Georg Kükenthal in 1925.

See also
 List of Cyperus species

References

undulatus
Taxa named by Georg Kükenthal
Plants described in 1925
Flora of Tanzania
Flora of Kenya